Ceromitia iolitha is a moth of the  family Adelidae or fairy longhorn moths. It was described by Edward Meyrick in 1914. It is found in Africa.

References

Moths described in 1914
Adelidae